The 1987–88 Buffalo Sabres season was the 18th season for the National Hockey League franchise that was established on May 22, 1970.

Offseason

Regular season

Final standings

Schedule and results

Playoffs
1988 Stanley Cup playoffs

Boston wins best-of-seven series 4–2.

Player statistics

Awards and records

Transactions

Draft picks
Buffalo's draft picks at the 1987 NHL Entry Draft held at the Joe Louis Arena in Detroit, Michigan.

Farm teams

See also
1987–88 NHL season

References

Buffalo
Buffalo
Buffalo Sabres seasons
Buffalo Sabres
Buffalo Sabres